The year 1895 was marked, in science fiction, by the following events.

Births and deaths

Births 
 January 16 : Nat Schachner, American writer (died 1955)
 December 16 :  B. R. Bruss, French writer (died 1980)

Deaths

Events

Awards 
The main science-fiction Awards known at the present time did not exist at that time.

Literary releases

Novels 
 Propeller Island by Jules Verne.
 The Time Machine by H. G. Wells.

Stories collections

Short stories 
 "Un Autre Monde" ("Another World") by J.-H. Rosny aîné

References

Science fiction by year

science-fiction